The Monastery of Saint Markella (Greek: Ιερό Προσκύνημα Αγίας Μαρκέλλας Χίου) is a Greek Orthodox female monastery on the island of Chios, near the village of Volissos, birthplace of the saint.

References

Sources
Ιερό Προσκύνημα Αγίας Μαρκέλλας

Greek Orthodox monasteries in Greece
Eastern Orthodox church buildings in Greece
Buildings and structures in Chios